Ziena (or Ziéna) is a village and seat (chef-lieu) of the commune of Fagui in the Cercle of Koutiala in the Sikasso Region of southern Mali. The village is 45 km southwest of Koutiala.

References

Populated places in Sikasso Region